The spined loach (Cobitis taenia) is a common freshwater fish in Europe. It is sometimes known as spotted weather loach, not to be confused with the "typical" weather loaches of the genus Misgurnus. This is the type species of the spiny loach genus (Cobitis) and the true loach family (Cobitidae).

Description
Their backs feature a yellow-brown colouring interspersed with many small grey or brown scales on the spinal ridge. The scales on the belly are pale yellow or orange. The body overall is long and thin. There are 6 barbels around the mouth. Under the eyes there is a two-pointed spike, with which the fish can inflict a painful sting.

Distribution and relationships
It is found from the Volga River basin  to France. Generally it occurs across much of temperate Europe north of the Alpide belt, with the exceptions of Ireland, Scotland, Wales and northern Scandinavia. Some populations are also found just south of the Alpides.  In the UK, the spined loach appears to be restricted to five east-flowing river systems in eastern England – the Rivers Trent, Welland, Witham, Nene and Great Ouse.

Populations of southwestern Europe were formerly included in this species, but actually represent distinct branches of Cobitis. A member of subgenus Cobitis, close relatives of the spined loach are C. elongatoides, C. fahirae, C. tanaitica or C. vardarensis which replace it in northern Greece, much of Romania, and western Turkey.

Ecology and behaviour
Clear oxygen-rich water is preferred by the spined loach, be it slowly flowing brooks, rivers or still water. They are found near flat and sandy or stony areas, frequently in large numbers. The spined loach is often kept as an ornamental fish in aquaria.

During the day, they bury themselves in the bed of the body of water, leaving only the head and tail exposed. At night, when the loach is most active, sand on the riverbed is consumed, and with it small animals and other organic material. Sand, stripped of nutrients, is ejected through the gills. This process must continue all night for the fish to get enough calories to survive.

Spined loaches possess the ability of intestinal breathing. This stop-gap measure sustains the spined loach when the water around it is oxygen-poor.  At the water's surface swallowed air brings oxygen into the intestine. The expended air is expelled through the anus.

The spawning season is from April to June. The females produce between 300 and 1,500 eggs close to the ground: on stones, roots or plants.  The eggs are then fertilized by the males. The larvae hatch in 4 to 6 days.

The spined loach's lifespan is between 3 and 5 years, with the maximum reached in captivity being 10 years.

See also
 Loach

Footnotes

References

 
 
 
  (2008): The molecular diversity of adriatic spined loaches (Teleostei, Cobitidae). Mol. Phylogenet. Evol. 46(1): 382–390.  (HTML abstract)

Cobitis
Freshwater fish of Europe
Fish of Europe
Fish of Russia
Fish described in 1758
Taxa named by Carl Linnaeus